Mikhalevo is a rural locality (a village) in Shelotskoye Rural Settlement, Verkhovazhsky District, Vologda Oblast, Russia. The population was 13 as of 2002.

Geography 
The distance to Verkhovazhye is 82.5 km, to Shelota is 13 km. Stepachevskaya, Stolbovo, Akinkhovskaya, Anisimovskaya are the nearest rural localities.

References 

Rural localities in Verkhovazhsky District